Ove Sørensen Schjelderup (1674–1756) was a Norwegian government official.  He was educated at the University of Copenhagen.  He was given the job of prosecutor for the Supreme Court of the Kingdom of Denmark-Norway in 1697. In 1704 he was appointed to be the County Governor of Nordland county, a position he held from 1704 until his retirement in 1751.

He was the grandson of Peder Jenssøn Schjelderup.  He married Kristin Hansdatter Munch in 1715.  She was the daughter of Hans Munch, the Bishop of Christiania.

References

1674 births
1756 deaths
County governors of Norway
County governors of Nordland